Zgórze  is a village in the administrative district of Gmina Dąbrowice, within Kutno County, Łódź Voivodeship, in central Poland.

Zgórze was a royal estate village (Kłodawski starosty) colonised by the Dutch settlers in 1782, with 12 houses by 1790. The village had an Evangelical house of prayer, school and cemetery.

References

Villages in Kutno County